Adam K. Bert (1905–2007), of Beaver Falls, Pennsylvania, was a stamp collector and dealer, who operated his stamp business in Pittsburgh.

Collecting interests
For his own collections, Bert was interested in collecting “socked on the nose” cancellations on postage stamps, as well as first day covers of stamps of the United States.

Philatelic activity
Bert started collecting stamps as a teenager, and then sold them to classmates in school and to his teachers. By the time he was 18, he established his first day cover business.

Bert “serviced” first day covers by having the appropriate post office cancel his special first day covers with the appropriate cancellation, and then returning the cancelled covers to his customers.

One of Bert's customers was fellow stamp collector Franklin Delano Roosevelt, who was governor of New York at the time.

Honors and awards
Bert received the Silver Tray award of the American First Day Cover Society for numerous articles he wrote on fraudulent first day covers.

Legacy
Bert was over 100 years old when he died and had the distinction of having the longest tenure of membership at the American Philatelic Society. He also had the distinction, when he closed his downtown Pittsburgh store in 1996, of operating the nation's oldest first-day cover service.

See also
 Philately
 Philatelic literature

References
 Obituary: Adam K. Bert / Stamp collector, dealer

1905 births
2007 deaths
American centenarians
Men centenarians
People from Beaver Falls, Pennsylvania
Philatelic literature
American stamp dealers
Washington & Jefferson College alumni
American philatelists
People from Pittsburgh